Deh-e Yusof Ali (also Romanized as Deh-e Yūsof ‘Alī, Deh Yūsof ‘Alī, Deh Yūsef ‘Alī, and Deh Yoosef Ali; also known as Deh Yūsef and Yūsef ‘Alī) is a village in Oshtorinan Rural District, Oshtorinan District, Borujerd County, Lorestan Province, Iran. At the 2006 census, its population was 262, in 69 families.

References 

Towns and villages in Borujerd County